Ego is a 2021 Spanish psychological horror thriller film directed by Alfonso Cortés-Cavanillas which stars María Pedraza.

Plot 
It is set during the COVID-19 lockdown. Paloma begins to use an app to date same sex people to have some fun. She finds out there is a profile of another girl identical to her, seemingly intending to replacing her.

Cast

Production 
Produced by La Caña Films, the film was written by Jorge Navarro de Lemus and directed by Alfonso Cortés-Cavanillas. Pedro Vendrell Martínez was responsible for the cinematography.

Release 
The film was screened at the Brooklyn Horror Film Festival held in October 2021. Distributed by Begin Again Films, it was theatrically released in Spain on 1 December 2021.

Awards and nominations 

|-
| align = "center" rowspan = "3" | 2021 || rowspan = "3" | Brooklyn Horror Film Festival || Best Feature Film || ||  || rowspan = "3" | 
|-
| Best Screenplay || || 
|-
| Best Actress || María Pedraza || 
|}

See also 
 List of Spanish films of 2021

References

External links
 Ego at ICAA's Catálogo de Cinespañol
 

2020s psychological horror films
2021 films
Films about the COVID-19 pandemic
Films set in the 2020s
Spanish horror films
2020s Spanish-language films
2020s Spanish films
Spanish psychological thriller films
2021 psychological thriller films